Kwoor (also known as Koor) is a District of Tambrauw Regency in Southwest Papua, Indonesia.

Demography

Population
As of the 2010 census, the population of Kwoor was 961.

References

Populated places in Southwest Papua
Populated places in Tambrauw

Southwest Papua